Zhao Shunxin (born 11 October 1979) is a Chinese former judoka who competed in the 2000 Summer Olympics.

References

1979 births
Living people
Olympic judoka of China
Judoka at the 2000 Summer Olympics
Place of birth missing (living people)
Chinese female judoka
21st-century Chinese women